Sports communication is an aspect of communication studies that specializes in the study of communication in a sports setting. The management of communication in sports organizations has changed towards greater professionalization, applying and exploiting technological innovations.

It encompasses the study of interpersonal and organizational communication (both verbal and non-verbal) between participants within a sport (e.g. players, coaches, managers, referees, and trainers), fans, and the media; and the way that sports are represented and communicated in the media. Sports communication is not restricted to professionals only, it is something that happens at different levels of play, ranging from preschool to college level. Communication happens constantly in sport, and works best with people that are willing to work well as a team and is vital for the success of a program. Studies have found that communication in sport can be both positive and negative due to evidence supporting a connection between communication and cohesion.

Organizational Communication 
Organizational Communication in Sport includes intra- and interorganizational communication.  Through organizational communication it is looked at an importance for coaches to motivate employees, encourage the involvement from workers, have self motivation, be good at problem solving, having a direct interpersonal style and being a good listener.

Interpersonal Communication 
Interpersonal communication in sport involves intrapersonal, interpersonal, and small-group communication. One type of interpersonal communication that happens in sport is between players and coaches. The way a coach communicates with their players can have an impact on the performance level of the player. Players are able to pick up on cues from their coaches when they are stressed, which can negatively affect the players performance and development.

Careers

Photo Journalism 
The various occupations that make up the field of sport communication typically involve some aspect of covering, delivering, publicizing, financing, or even shaping sport. Photos are also a big job in the field of sports communication. Photos of athletes are becoming more and more common in the sports communication area. People that love sports like having the picture either on their wall or on the background or even just having them. Photographers will also get live action shots to make people get the real action of the game. Professionals in sport communication craft and send messages in various ways, and they may alter their modes of communication depending on the nature of their position as well as audience needs and desires. Photography is used to project a feeling for a viewer to control and give an emotion. This focuses on the challenges photojournalists face in this industry. It describes the struggle they face with selective access to sporting because of commercial licensing and image rights. Although positions in sport communication vary in both nature (e.g., management, publicity, writing) and scope (e.g., traditional print, television, radio, online), the various career paths in the field all hinge on the ability to communicate with key audiences. These audiences also vary, depending on the type of sport entity in question, but they generally consist of whatever constituencies are deemed most valuable to the organization. Key audiences may include fans, members of the public, politicians, owners and investors, athletes, and even members of the media.
Sports marketers help communicate information about a sports event or help market products through different types of promotion. One promotion is social media. People post on social media about games, new players, new coaches and a ton other things related to their team. Education careers in usage of communication can be found in sports administrative degrees and the professors of those degrees. Sports communication can be considered linguistic but other types of communicating, such as body movement and other mannerisms can be formally taught through professors or educators. Administrative communication in the sports area can be considered vital in the success of programs and the progress of the student. Sports administration can often lead into the roles of other professions such as broadcasting and marketing.
 Agents and Business Managers of Artists, Performers, and Athletes.
 Communications Teachers, Postsecondary.
Career Topics

Other fields of sport communication that are easily forgotten or not noticed, are fields in entertainment. Careers in the entertainment industry include the following careers such as video games, movies, music, and nontraditional aspects in the field.

In fact, some of the best opportunities in sport communication involve behind-the-scenes occupations, many of which exist in the production and operations sides of the industry. Examples include equipment technician, audio engineer, sport videographer, graphic designer, and technical writer. Some sport arena and stadium jobs can be electronic technician, master control operator, public address announcer, and video engineer.

Careers in Entertainment

Movies and TV shows are examples of communication through sports. Sports documentaries show the significance of the historic events in the past. Shows like 30 for 30 by ESPN allow the receiver of the show to connect to the show. The show can inform and empower the audience. Therefore, there are many different job opportunities in film that can help the audience communicate through sports and to show how we can communicate through sports.

Entertainers and Performers, Sports and Related Workers, All Others.
 Public Relations Specialists.
 Radio and Television Announcers.
 Reporters and Correspondents.
Sports communication is an aspect of communication studies that specializes in the study of communication in a sports setting. Communication has become “a key factor for the efficient management of sports organizations, leading to the implementation of increasingly
professionalized communication processes”. The communication
offices of sports formations have become more professionalized, allowing them to interact with their target audiences without needing traditional media. Therefore,
they have been one of the fastest growing departments, given their work in
social networks, internet and institutional event management. Corporate communication allows sport entities to create and disseminate
their own identity.

It encompasses the study of interpersonal and organizational communication (both verbal and non-verbal) between participants within a sport (e.g. players, coaches, managers, referees, and trainers), fans, and the media; and the way that sports are represented and communicated in the media. Sports communication is not restricted to professionals only, it is something that happens at different levels of play, ranging from preschool to college level. Communication happens constantly in sport, and works best with people that are willing to work well as a team and is vital for the success of a program. Studies have found that communication in sport can be both positive and negative due to evidence supporting a connection between communication and cohesion.   

Non-Verbal Communication

An aspect of communication in sports is non-verbal communication. Non-verbal communication is when two or more people express communication using anything besides words. This can be facial movements, reading posture, eye contact, or the tone of one's voice. Participants in sports use and examine non-verbal communication when verbal communication cannot be used. Players and teams use the aspects of non-verbal communication to connect coordination and helps share information or upcoming tactics. Effective non-verbal communication uses only needed movement and not excessive movement which can decrease effectiveness of the non-verbal communication and coordination of the team.

Opportunities 

Sports create a context for positive communication and pro-social behaviors that often occur off of the field or court. For example, many athletes speak in public to children or act as motivational speakers. In tough situations, such as the aftermath of natural disasters, well-known athletes can lift the moral of an affected community.  Sports writer Lars Anderson wrote in his book The Storm and The Tide about how sports helped bring a town together after a disastrous tornado. Also, the situation and community coming together affected the college sports team at The University of Alabama. Sports communication theories allow for the prediction of many facets of communication such as gender, race, identity, culture, and politics.

Sports communication varies vastly between individual sports and plays an important role in the success of teams and organizations. A good example of sports communication and its effects on players, organizations, and media was the well-documented conflict involving two players for the Miami Dolphins. Inappropriate, discriminatory, and abusive interactions between Richie Incognito and Jonathan Martin lead to the release of Richie from the team, organizational issues, and an abundance of media coverage both negative and positive. Another example of sport communication is the recent "deflategate" scandal involving the New England Patriots apparently deflating the footballs during half-time of the AFC Championship game against the Indianapolis Colts. Head coach Bill Belichick claims that any wrongdoing was done by the team's equipment manager and ball boy, and no communication had occurred between them two at any point in the game. This reflects sports communication because it is an example of a lack of communication between an inferior member of an organization and the head coach, which eventually led to a wide spread and highly publicized scandal which could've jeopardized the Patriots' participation in the Super Bowl.

Connections
Sports communication also focuses on the interpersonal communications between coaches, players, referees, athletic trainers and more people who work for the team. People will ask them questions either about a player, team, someone who is injured and give a report back to their network for them to publish an article about them. Also photography is growing during this new and upcoming of careers. Most people need photographers to take pictures of players for either magazines, and their social media page. Most of the photographs are also doing their job for people who are fans of sports teams to hang pictures on their wall. They even are on "Rookie Cards" that can be traded for big money.

References

Pedersen, Paul; Miloch, Kimberly S.; Laucella, Pamela C. (2007). Strategic Sport Communication. Human Kinetics. 
Abeza, Gashaw; O'Riley, Norm; Nadeau, John (September 1, 2014). "Sport Communication: A Multidimensional Assessment of the Field's Development". International Journal of Sport Communication.
Pedersen, Paul M., Pamela C. Laucella, Kian Edward (Ted) M., and Andrea N. Geurin. "Careers in Sport Communication." Strategic Sport Communication. Human Kinetics, 2021. Print.
Further reading
Brown, Robert S. (2003). Case Studies in Sport Communication. Greenwood Publishing Group. 
Weinberg, Robert S. and Goujiel (2010). Foundations of Sport and Exercise Psychology, 5th edition. Human Kinetics.

External links
Effective Communication in Sports on livestrong.com

Communication
Sports science